Kim Barlow (born March 10, 1969) is a Canadian folk singer and musician.

Biography
Barlow was born in Montreal, Quebec, and raised in rural Nova Scotia, she is of Anglo-Quebecker descent. She studied classical guitar at Florida State University before moving to the Yukon in the 1990s. In 2013 she left the Yukon so she could move back to Nova Scotia.

Music career
Kim Barlow has released on the independent record label Caribou Records in Whitehorse, Yukon and on Jericho Beach Music in Vancouver. Her album Saplings (2010) was produced with Jean Martin of Barnyard Records in Toronto and Bob Hamilton at Old Crow Recording in Whitehorse.

She has toured across Canada and internationally as a solo artist and as part of the Pan Canadian New Folk Ensemble tour with Christine Fellows and Old Man Luedecke. She frequently collaborates with Mathias Kom of The Burning Hell in the side project Spring Breakup.

Her second album, Gingerbread, was a nominee for Roots and Traditional Album of the Year (Solo) at the Juno Awards of 2003.

In 2009, she recorded "Dawson City" for CBC Radio 2's Great Canadian Song Quest.

Discography
 Humminah (Caribou, 1999)
 Gingerbread (Caribou, 2001)
 Luckyburden (Caribou, 2004)
 Champ (Jericho Beach, 2007)
 Saplings (2010)
 How To Let Go (2018)

References

External links
 Official site

1969 births
Living people
Anglophone Quebec people
Canadian folk singer-songwriters
Canadian women singer-songwriters
Florida State University alumni
Musicians from Nova Scotia
Musicians from Yukon
People from Whitehorse
Singers from Montreal
Songwriters from Quebec
Writers from Montreal
21st-century Canadian women singers